2-Methylene glutaronitrile is a dimerization product of acrylonitrile and a starting material for di- and triamines, for the biocide 2-bromo-2-(bromomethyl)pentanedinitrile and for heterocycles, such as 3-cyanopyridine.

Preparation 
2-Methylene glutaronitrile is a side-product in the production of hexanedinitrile which is used (after hydrogenation to 1,6-diaminohexane) as a key component for engineering polymers such as the polyamides (PA 66) or polyurethanes. Hexanedinitrile can be industrially produced by electrochemical hydrodimerisation or by catalytic dimerization of acrylonitrile.

A catalytic tail-tail dimerization of two acrylonitrile molecules forms hexanedinitrile:

Also head-to-tail dimerization can occur in the process. In the presence of tricyclohexylphosphine (PCy3) a yield of up to 77% 2-methylene glutaronitrile can be obtained:

Metal halides (such as zinc chloride or aluminum chloride) are used with tertiary amines (such as triethylamine) as catalysts for the dimerization. Crude yields of up to 84% are achieved. Often, significant amounts of product are lost during the work-up (e. g. extraction and  distillation) because of the tendency to polymerization of 2-methylene glutaronitrile.

In addition to the linear dimerization products 1,4-dicyano-2-butene and 1,4-dicyano-3-butene (obtained as cis-trans isomer mixtures) usually also other oligomers (and polymers) of acrylonitrile are formed. During the electrochemical hydrooligomerization of acrylonitrile, these are trimers, such as 1,3,6- and 1,3,5-tricyanohexane or tetramers, such as 1,3,6,8- and 1,3,5,8-tetracyanooctane. The reaction of acrylonitrile with tributylphosphine affords 2-methyleneglutaronitrile in a modest yield of about 10% after fractional distillation. The DABCO-catalyzed acrylonitrile dimerization of 2,4-dicyano-1-butene after 10 days at room temperature is with 40% yield similarly inefficient.

Use 
The earlier patent literature describes processes for the isomerization of 2-methylene glutaronitrile to 1,4-dicyanobutenes as hexanedinitrile precursors, which became obsolete with the optimization of the electrochemical hydrodimerization of acrylonitrile to hexanedinitrile.

The electrochemical hydrodimerization of 2-methylene glutaronitrile produces 1,3,6,8-tetracyanooctane.

In the hydrogenation of 2-methylene glutaronitrile in the presence of palladium on carbon, hydrogen is attached to the double bond and 2-methylglutaronitrile is obtained in virtually quantitative yield.

The hydrogenation of the nitrile groups requires more severe conditions and the presence of ammonia or amines to suppress the formation of secondary amines. This second hydrogenation step is carried out with Raney-cobalt as the hydrogenation catalyst to give 2-methyl-1,5-pentanediamine in 80% yield.

Hydrogenation of 2-methylene glutaronitrile in the presence of ammonia with manganese-containing sodium oxide-doped cobalt catalyst (at 80 to 100 °C and pressures of 200 atm in a tubular reactor) leads to the addition of ammonia to the double bond and directly converts the compound to 2-aminomethyl-1,5-pentanediamine with yields of 66%.

The branched triamine can be used in epoxides and polyurethanes.

2-Methylenglutaronitrile reacts with methanamide upon catalysis with 4-(dimethylamino)-pyridine (DMAP) at 60 °C in 47% yield to give 1-(N-methanoylamino)-2,4-dicyanobutane, from which α- aminomethylglutaric acid is formed by subsequent hydrolysis.

Heating 2-methyleneglutaronitrile with an alkaline ion exchanger, pyridine and water to 150 °C in an autoclave yields the lactam 5-cyano-2-piperidone in 80% yield.

2-Methylene glutaronitrile can be polymerized to various homo- and copolymers via anionic polymerization with sodium cyanide, sodium in liquid ammonia or with butyllithium. However, the polymers are formed only in low yields and show unsatisfactory properties such as intrinsic viscosities and poor mechanical properties.

The main use of 2-methyleneglutaronitrile is as starting material for the broad-spectrum biocide 2-bromo-2-(bromomethyl)pentanedinitrile (methyldibromo-glutaronitrile), which is formed in virtually quantitative yield by the addition of bromine to the double bond.

From the chlorine-analogous 2-chloro-2-(chloromethyl)pentenenitrile, 3-cyanopyridine is obtained by heating to 150 °C with tin(IV)chloride.

References 

Vinylidene compounds
Nitriles